Mark Dennis González Hoffmann (born 10 July 1984) is a Chilean former professional footballer who played as a midfielder. He played top flight football in Chile, Russia, Spain, Brazil and England. He was described by José Mari Bakero, the sporting director of Real Sociedad, one of his former clubs, as "fast and explosive, the classic left winger but with technical discipline", while he claimed himself that his speed was his greatest asset.

He made his international debut in 2003, and was selected from Chile for three Copa América tournaments and the 2010 FIFA World Cup, winning the Copa América Centenario.

Early life
González was born in Durban, South Africa. His father Raúl was a professional footballer for Durban Bush Bucks, and named him after his friends and fellow footballers Mark Tovey and Dennis Wicks. He left South Africa aged 10 in 1994 and moved back to Chile with his mother.

Club career

Liverpool
European champions Liverpool attempted to sign González on loan from Albacete in the summer of 2005, but were unsuccessful as he was denied a work permit by British authorities. In October that year, a deal was struck between the two teams for a permanent transfer. In January 2006, while González awaited eligibility for a Spanish passport so he could work freely in Britain, Liverpool loaned him to Real Sociedad.

Real Sociedad (loan)
González was presented on loan at Real Sociedad on 30 January 2006, until 30 June, alongside Jhon Viáfara, whom the club had loaned from Portsmouth. González said that at Sociedad he would aim to improve his tactical play.

At Sociedad, González put in some good performances, most notably against Real Madrid, against whom he scored Sociedad's equaliser on 8 April as the game finished 1–1. He played 16 league games for Sociedad and scored five goals. Sociedad showed interest in taking him permanently, along with several other La Liga clubs, but González is quoted to have said, "I am very thankful to Real Sociedad and their coach José Mari Bakero, but while they'd like me to stay I'm going to England to join Liverpool."

Return to Liverpool
On 5 July 2006, González was granted a work permit, and was allowed to start his Liverpool career, wearing the number 11 shirt. His manager, Rafael Benítez, said, "This is very good news for us and I am absolutely delighted to welcome Mark González to Liverpool as he is a player the supporters will like to see." González made his first appearance as a half-time substitute for fellow debutant Fábio Aurélio in a pre-season friendly away against Crewe Alexandra on 22 July.

González made his competitive debut on 9 August 2006 against Israeli side Maccabi Haifa, coming off the bench in the 85th minute for Steven Gerrard and scoring an 88th-minute winner in Liverpool's Champions League 3rd Round Qualifier to seal a 2–1 win. He scored his first Premier League goal in Liverpool's 3–0 win over Tottenham Hotspur on his first league start for the club on 23 September. He scored just once more for Liverpool, in a 4–0 win over Fulham on 10 December.

González was injured inside the first ten minutes of the quarter-finals of the League Cup against Arsenal on 9 January 2007 as a result of a challenge on Theo Walcott. He was brought off on a stretcher for Luis García, who was also taken off injured later in the match as Liverpool lost 3–6. He played his last game for Liverpool on 5 May 2007 against Fulham in a 1–0 defeat. but then he had an ankle injury

Real Betis
On 24 May 2007, Rafael Benítez confirmed that Liverpool had almost reached an agreement with Real Betis over the Chilean winger. On 12 June, González confirmed that he had signed a contract for £5 million with Betis, who presented him to the press and fans on 17 July 2007. He went on to score on his home debut with a penalty goal in the 1–0 victory over Champions League holders Milan in the Centenary Match in front of 55,000 fans. González scored in a 2–1 victory over high-flying Real Madrid to steer Betis out of the relegation zone in La Liga. He ultimately scored ten goals in 44 first-team appearances for the club. Betis received an offer of €11 million from an unnamed club in July 2008.

CSKA Moscow
 
In June 2009, following the relegation of Real Betis, Greek double holders Olympiacos made an offer of €3 million to secure him a starting eleven position in their squad for the forthcoming Champions League, but CSKA Moscow offered €6.5 million and on 11 August 2009, he signed a five-year deal with the Russian club. He debuted for the club on 16 August 2009 in a league match away to Lokomotiv Moscow.

On 6 December 2010, it was reported that he had been accused of rape in Moscow. However, later the same day the investigators announced that the accused was an unrelated Portuguese citizen named Mario Gonzalez, who is also allegedly a professional footballer.

On 21 January 2014, CSKA announced that González had left them to join Universidad Católica in Chile on loan.
In December 2014, González had his CSKA contract terminated by mutual consent.

Universidad Católica
Originally a loan, González joined his first professional club Universidad Católica in Chile in January 2015 after spending ten years abroad. After the mutual termination of his contract at CSKA, he joined Católica on a permanent move as a free agent. He helped the team with nine goals in the campaign, which Católica won. It was also González's first Primera División win after previously finishing second in the 2002 Clausura.

González signed a new one-year deal with Católica for the 2015–16 season.

Sport Recife 
On 4 January 2016, González rescinded his contract at Universidad Católica and joined Brazilian club Sport Recife for the next two years. He made his debut on the 31st, playing the full 90 minutes as they lost 1–0 at Salgueiro Atlético Clube in the 2016 Campeonato Pernambucano first match of the year. He played only one more game before being sidelined for a month by a thigh injury, and totalled seven appearances as they finished runners-up to Santa Cruz.

González made his Campeonato Brasileiro Série A debut on 14 May as his team began the season with a 1–0 loss at Flamengo; he was substituted after 49 minutes for Serginho.

Colo Colo 
On 30 December 2016, González signed for Chilean club Colo Colo.

International career
Born in South Africa, González was also eligible to play for that country, but he chose Chile instead.

On 21 June 2010, González scored the only goal of the game for Chile against Switzerland during the group stage of the 2010 FIFA World Cup in his birthplace South Africa, heading in a cross from Esteban Paredes.

He was named in the preliminary squad for the 2015 Copa America but was omitted from the final squad. The following year he was not initially named in Chile's Copa América Centenario squad, but was called up when Matías Fernández withdrew through injury. Chile went on to win the tournament.

International goals
Scores and results list Chile's goal tally first.

Personal life
He is the son of the former Chile international footballer Raúl González as well as the brother of the actor and football agent Raúl Hoffmann.

González began dating Chilean television personality and model Maura Rivera in 2008, and they married in 2010. They have one son, Mark González, Jr. In 2015, they welcome their daughter Luciana González.

In March 2021, González suffered from mild pericarditis, which was treated successfully and he made a full recovery.

Honours

Club
Liverpool
FA Community Shield: 2006
UEFA Champions League runner-up: 2006–07

CSKA
Russian Premier League: 2012–13, 2013–14
Russian Cup: 2010–11, 2012–13
Russian Super Cup: 2013

International
Chile
 Copa América: 2016

Individual
In the list of 33 best football players of the championship of Russia: 2010

References

External links

 
 Mark González – CSKA unofficial site  
 LFC History Profile
 
 pfc-cska.org Profile

1984 births
Living people
Sportspeople from Durban
Chilean footballers
Chile international footballers
Chile youth international footballers
South African soccer players
Chilean people of South African descent
South African people of Chilean descent
Chilean expatriate footballers
South African expatriate soccer players
2004 Copa América players
2007 Copa América players
2010 FIFA World Cup players
La Liga players
Premier League players
Russian Premier League players
Club Deportivo Universidad Católica footballers
Albacete Balompié players
Liverpool F.C. players
Real Sociedad footballers
Real Betis players
PFC CSKA Moscow players
Sport Club do Recife players
Colo-Colo footballers
Association football midfielders
Expatriate footballers in Spain
Expatriate footballers in England
Expatriate footballers in Russia
Expatriate footballers in Brazil
Chilean expatriate sportspeople in Spain
Chilean expatriate sportspeople in Russia
Chilean expatriate sportspeople in England
Chilean expatriate sportspeople in Brazil
South African expatriate sportspeople in Spain
South African expatriate sportspeople in Russia
South African expatriate sportspeople in England
South African expatriate sportspeople in Brazil
Naturalised citizens of Spain
Campeonato Brasileiro Série A players
Copa América-winning players
Citizens of Chile through descent